Eryngium pandanifolium, called the pandan-like-leaved eryngo, is a species of flowering plant in the genus Eryngium, native to Brazil, Paraguay, Uruguay, and Argentina, and introduced in Australia, New Zealand and Portugal. It has gained the Royal Horticultural Society's Award of Garden Merit.

Subtaxa
The following varieties are currently accepted:
Eryngium pandanifolium var. chamissonis (Urb.) Mathias & Constance
Eryngium pandanifolium var. lassauxii (Decne.) Mathias & Constance

Invasive species
Eryngium pandanifolium is legally classified as an invasive species in Portugal since 1999. It has settled in damp areas around the Tagus and Mondego river basins.

References

pandanifolium
Flora of Brazil
Flora of southern South America
Plants described in 1826